Bonnie Bunyau anak Gustin (born 3 June 1999) is a Malaysian powerlifter. He won Malaysia's first ever gold medal in the sport in the men's 72 kg event at the 2020 Summer Paralympics in Tokyo, breaking the Paralympic record in the process.

Early and personal life
Bonnie hails from Kampung Baru Mawang, Serian, Sarawak. He is of Bidayuh ancestry, a Bumiputera native of the Malaysian state of Sarawak. His father, Gustin Jenang competed in Para powerlifting at the 2010 World Championships in Kuala Lumpur. while his older brother, Bryan Junancey Gustin has also participated in the sport at international level. Bonnie took up the sport at age 15.

Career

He competed at the 2018 Commonwealth Games where he came 4th in the lightweight event. In 2020 Tokyo Paralympics Games, Bonnie was chosen as the Malaysian flag bearer at the opening ceremony. He then set a new Paralympic record of 228 kg and earned Malaysia's first gold medal of the Paralympics Games in powerlifting. A few months later, he won the gold medal in his event at the 2021 World Para Powerlifting Championships held in Tbilisi, Georgia. He also set a new world record of 230 kg in the men's 72 kg event at the 2021 World Para Powerlifting World Cup in Dubai. In 2022, he won the gold in the Men's Lightweight powerlifting event at the Birmingham 2022 Commonwealth Games.

References

External links
 

Paralympic powerlifters of Malaysia
Paralympic gold medalists for Malaysia
Living people
1999 births
People from Sarawak
Malaysian powerlifters
Medalists at the 2020 Summer Paralympics
Iban people
Malaysian Christians
Paralympic medalists in powerlifting
Powerlifters at the 2020 Summer Paralympics
20th-century Malaysian people
21st-century Malaysian people
Powerlifters at the 2022 Commonwealth Games
Commonwealth Games gold medallists for Malaysia
Powerlifters at the 2018 Commonwealth Games
Commonwealth Games medallists in powerlifting
Medallists at the 2022 Commonwealth Games